Dilhorne is a civil parish in the district of Staffordshire Moorlands, Staffordshire, England. It contains 19 listed buildings that are recorded in the National Heritage List for England.  Of these, one is at Grade II*, the middle of the three grades, and the others are at Grade II, the lowest grade.  The parish contains the village of Dilhorne, and the surrounding countryside, mainly to the north of the village.  The listed buildings consist of houses, farmhouses and farm buildings, a church and items in the churchyard, and the lodge to a former hall.


Key

Buildings

References

Citations

Sources

Lists of listed buildings in Staffordshire